Little Creek is a  long 1st order tributary to the Cape Fear River in Harnett County, North Carolina.  This stream rises and flows entirely within Raven Rock State Park.

Course
Little Creek rises about 4 miles north-northeast of Mamers, North Carolina in Raven Rock State Park and then flows northeast and east to join the Cape Fear River about 5 miles west-southwest of Kipling, North Carolina.

Watershed
Little Creek drains  of area, receives about 46.5 in/year of precipitation, has a wetness index of 360.67 and is about 92% forested.

See also
List of rivers of North Carolina

External links
Raven Rock State Park

References

Rivers of North Carolina
Rivers of Harnett County, North Carolina
Tributaries of the Cape Fear River